Somapala Dharmapriya (29 September 1940 – 14 September 1992), was an actor in Sri Lankan cinema as well as a cinematographer.

Personal life
Fernando was born on 29 September 1940 in Jaffna even though lived in Moratuwa. He was educated at Lakshapathiya Student College, Moratuwa, Prince of Wales' College, Moratuwa and Hunumulla Central College.

In March 1990, he suffered from a malignant cancer of the tongue. Doctors had his tongue amputated and underlying teeth were also removed. He could not speak and quit from cinema. There was also a film festival conducted by Lester to help him. In the final days, he only depend on melted food. He died on 14 September 1992 at the age of 51. He was married to Princy de Silva.

Career
In 1956 he entered cinema as a child artist with the film Rekava directed by Lester James Peries with the role "Sena". Because he spent six months in Alawwa, Bandarawela and Kelaniya for about a month for filming, he lost the school and then attended to another school. He was highly popularized with the film. After that film, Dharmapriya acted in several commercially successful films directed by Lester, including Delovak Athara, Desa Nisa and Gehenu Lamai. However, he preferred to study cinematography and the technical side of cinema. Then, he studied cinematography under Willie Blake and worked as an assistant cinematographer in the films Gamperaliya and Delowak Athara.

His maiden cinematography came through the film Adarawanthayo directed by Amaranath Jayathilake. He was the chief cinematographer in the films Pem Kurullo, Bonikka, Mawubima Nathnam Maranaya, Adara Kathawa, Salambak Handai, Salli Thibunata Madi and Mawubime Weerayo.

Filmography

References

External links
 අපි දෙන්නා මුණගැහුණේ "රේඛාව" හින්දා : සුමිත්‍රා පීරිස්
 රේඛාව-මනමේ සර්වකාලීනයි

1940 births
1992 deaths
Sri Lankan male film actors
Sinhalese male actors
Sri Lankan cinematographers